Vanitha Vijayakumar (born 5 October 1980) is an Indian actress who has appeared predominantly in Tamil. She has also acted in Malayalam, Telugu and Kannada language films. She made her cinematic acting debut in 1995, along with actor Vijay in Chandralekha, where she played the title role. She has acted more than 20 films in languages such as Tamil, Telugu, Malayalam and Kannada.

She made her acting debut at the age of 14 in the 1995 Tamil film Chandralekha with Vijay. She made her debut in Malayalam cinema with Hitler Brothers (1997) and Telugu with Devi (1999). 

Vanitha is also one of the highest paid television personalities in the South Indian film and television industry along with other popular personalities such as Priyanka Deshpande and Sreemukhi who are also leading ladies in the Indian television industry. In Bigg Boss Tamil 3 Vanitha was the highest paid contestant in history and broke records in India alone for her income after the show, making her one of the richest women in Tamil Nadu after her networth and income was counted.

In 2020, Vanitha filled a defamation lawsuit against her partner Peter Paul. Vijayakumar wanted an immediate defamation case against Paul and the court of Tamil Nadu awarded Vanitha US$8.56 million in cash after the jury voted for her in favour of the court case. She later immediately filled a divorce against Paul and the couple broke up soon after the case ended and the divorce papers were approved.   After her defamtion case with Peter paul ended, she immediately filled another defamation case against actress Lakshmy Ramakrishnan and demanding Rs 2.5 crore worth of money for violating her privacy and defaming her on various different social media platforms. However Lakshmy Ramakrishnan also filled a defamation report against Vanitha in return demanding around 1.25 crores of cash, the court and jury favored Lakshmy over Vanitha. Vanitha was also involved in creating rumors of actress Kasthuri on social media and defaming her reuptution on social media by creating false information, Vanitha was later taken to trial by supreme court of Tamil Nadu and was found guilty for defamation and was forced to remove herself from every social media platform. However Vanitha later rejoined social media in late 2021.

Early life
Vanitha is the eldest daughter of Tamil actor Vijayakumar and his second wife, Tamil actress Manjula. Vanitha has two younger sisters, Preetha and Sridevi, who are former actresses. From his first marriage to Muthukannu Vellalar, Vijayakumar had three children. Actor Arun Vijay and former actress Kavitha are among her half-siblings.

In September 2018, she had another public fallout with her family after she refused to leave a family property that she had initially rented for a shoot in Ashtalakshmi Nagar. Her father, Vijayakumar, subsequently filed a police complaint against her.

Career

Debut in Tamil and Malayalam cinema (1995–1999)
Vanitha made her acting debut opposite Vijay in Chandralekha (1995). Directed by Nambirajan, the film was shot in a small village and owing to the lack of caravans, Vanitha had to make use of basic conditions. The film opened to mixed reviews and eventually did not perform well at the box office, effectively curtailing Vanitha's career. Vanitha subsequently appeared alongside Rajkiran in Manikkam (1996), before moving on to act in the Malayalam film Hitler Brothers (1997) and Telugu devotional fantasy film Devi (1999). As film offers began to reduce, Vanitha worked as a costume designer for her sister Preetha's films, and then also worked as an assistant director to P. Vasu during the making of Kakkai Siraginilae (2000). After her first marriage to Akash, Vanitha quit the film industry.

Reentry into cinema (2013–2015)
Vanitha made a brief comeback to acting in the mid-2010s, and first appeared in a small role in Naan Rajavaga Pogiren (2013). She followed this up with a longer role in the comedy drama, Summa Nachunu Irukku (2013). Vanitha then chose to turn producer and make a film titled MGR Sivaji Rajini Kamal (2015), to be directed by her then-boyfriend Robert. She produced the film under the Vanitha Film Production banner, suggesting that the script of the film originated from a joke they discussed at a social gathering. Following the commercial failure of the film, Vanitha lodged a police complaint against distribution studio Vibrant Medias, alleging that they did not release the film in 80 cinemas as agreed in their contract. She was also rejected by most directors and didn't receive any film offers from directors, and she decided to quit acting for some time due to criticisms.

Recognition in Tamil television (2019–present)

In 2019, Vanitha appeared in the Tamil reality television show Bigg Boss Tamil 3 on Star Vijay. She was the second contestant to be eliminated from the show. After a few weeks of request from fans 
for Vanitha to enter the house as a wild card, and as after she left the TRP rating reduced, they sent her again as a contestant.

In 2020, Vanitha appeared on season 1 of the Tamil Cooking show Cooku with Comali on Star Vijay and became the winner.

She also later participated in the spin-off version show called Bigg Boss Ultimate (season 1) as a contestant.

She also appeared as a cameo appearance in the Zee Tamil soap opera Pudhu Pudhu Arthangal playing a small role in the serial.

She also signed up for the upcoming Tamil thriller film Andhagan playing a supporting role in the film. She also signed up for other Tamil films such as Anal Kaatru, 2K Azhaganathu Kaadhal, Sivappu Manithargal, Vasuvin Karppinigal, Kodooran, Kaathu, Kenny, Dhil Irandha Poradu, Rajini and Pickup Drop which all are currently undergoing filming. As of 2022 she has signed up more than 15 films in Tamil overall.

Personal life
Vanitha Vijayakumar married actor Akash on 10 September 2000. Their son was born in 2001 and their daughter was born in 2005. Following a lengthy custody dispute, the Madras High Court ordered that the children split their time between both parents. Her son later moved in permanently with his grandfather and then Akash.

Vanitha Vijayakumar got then married again with businessman Anand Jay Rajan, in 2007. The pair has a daughter. The couple separated soon after and were officially divorced in 2012, with Rajan being awarded custody of their child. Vanitha suggested that the pair divorced as a result of her disputes with Vijayakumar, and that Rajan had effectively become indirectly involved in the controversy costing her peace and career opportunities. In 2019, police questioned Vanitha while on the set of Bigg Boss Tamil 3 in Chennai over a complaint filed by Rajan alleging that she had kidnapped their daughter. Vanitha was not arrested after her daughter confirmed that she had voluntarily come to Chennai with her mother.

Following her separation with Anand Rajan in 2010, Vanitha dated choreographer Robert beginning in 2013. The duo also worked together professionally by producing a film titled MGR Sivaji Rajini Kamal (2015), before ending their relationship in 2017.

Vanitha was a born Hindu to Tamil parents. On 30 March 2022 she converted to Buddhism embracing the religion and underwent many various different religious rituals in which later she officially converted to the religion.

Vanitha was also suffering from Depression for more than 10 years, however she later underwent medical treatment and professional counselling and fully recovered.

Relationship with Peter Paul
She was in relationship with Peter Paul, who is already married and a father of two children. The couple got married on 27 June 2020 in Chennai. Vanitha's marital relationship with Peter was controversial among people. Peter's first wife, Elizabeth, had filed a case on Vanitha and her husband for not getting an official divorce before. As of October 2020, Vanitha had divorced Peter with mutual consent, owing to his ongoing addiction to cigarettes and alcohol.

Vanitha vs Nayanthara
In 2020, Vanitha involved Nayanthara in her argument about relationships stating that Nayanthara was a "Bitch" when she was dating dance expert Prabhu Deva back in 2011, this statement quickly circulated on social media and news channels rapidly and Vanitha's Twitter account was immediately removed by authorities and cyber security placing a permanent ban on her account for violation of conduct. In result to this Vanitha was also denied entry into Thailand due to a court case laid against her in India.

Vanitha vs Ramya Krishnan
During Bigg Boss Jodigal season 1 which aired on Star Vijay, Vanitha accused actress Ramya Krishnan of torturuing her on television sets and calling Vanitha by vulgur language. However Vanitha later demanded Ramya for USD 5.5 million dollars as a defamation case against Ramya and sued her in court, however Vanitha's court request was denied by Tamil Nadu government and revoked the case. Hence after the controversy Vanitha stepped out of Star Vijay and cancelled her contract with the network.

Off-screen work
In 2021, Vanitha officially opened up her own clothing store outlet named as Vanitha Vijayakumar Styling which is located in Chennai. She is also a part time costume designer.

Selected filmography

Television
Fiction

Non-fiction

YouTube

Stage shows

 Millennium Charity Concert 2000
 Sun Kudumbam Viruthugal (2019) Guest
Ananda Vikatan Cinema Awards (2020) Guest

References

External links
 

Living people
Actresses in Tamil cinema
Actresses in Malayalam cinema
Indian film actresses
20th-century Indian actresses
21st-century Indian actresses
Actresses in Telugu cinema
Bigg Boss (Tamil TV series) contestants
Actresses in Tamil television
1980 births
Place of birth missing (living people)